Edward Kent Woo  is an Australian secondary school teacher and writer best known for his online mathematics lessons published on YouTube. In 2018, Woo was awarded the Australia's Local Hero Award.

Early life
Woo's ethnic Chinese parents migrated to Australia from Malaysia around 1970 for better education opportunities for their children. He has an older brother, who works in IT, and an older sister, who is a dentist. Woo studied at the James Ruse Agricultural High School in New South Wales and completed his Higher School Certificate in 2003, placing in the top band for Mathematics Extension 1 and English Extension 2. He earned his Bachelor of Education (Honours) in Secondary Mathematics and Information Technology from the University of Sydney in 2008.

Career
Woo started his career with a brief stint as a technology teacher at the Fort Street High School in 2007, before moving to James Ruse Agricultural High School where in 2008 he held the position of Teacher Mathematics and Technology. He stayed until 2013 before becoming Head Teacher of Mathematics at Cherrybrook Technology High School. Woo remains there as a classroom teacher, but also serves as a mathematics curriculum leader for the NSW Department of Education. As of 2018, he has been teaching mathematics for more than 10 years. He began filming his class in 2012 when recording a lesson for a sick student. His YouTube channel has over 1.61 million subscribers and more than 139 million views worldwide as of October 2022.  In 2018, Woo hosted a show called Teenage Boss on the ABC, which gave teens control of their family's financial decisions for a month. In June 2018, Woo delivered a TEDx Talk titled "Mathematics is the sense you never knew you had".

Woo has published two books. The first is entitled Woo's Wonderful World of Maths was published on 25 September 2018. It addresses questions like "Why are rainbows curved?" and "Why aren't left-handers extinct?", with the answer being: maths, and that maths is all about patterns and the universe is extraordinarily patterned. The second, Eddie Woo's Magical Maths, is a children's activity book.

Awards
In October 2015, Woo was a joint recipient of the NSW Premier's Prize for Innovation in Science and Mathematics Education.

He was one of ten teachers to win the inaugural Choose Maths Awards on 26 August 2016.

In April 2017, Woo won the 2017 University of Sydney Young Alumni Award for Outstanding Achievement.

In March 2017, he was one of 12 Australian teachers to win a Commonwealth Bank Teaching Award, a prestigious national awards event co-presented each year by the Commonwealth Bank and education charity Schools Plus.

In November 2017, he was named 2018 NSW Local Hero.

Woo gave the Australia Day Address in NSW in 2018, the first time a teacher has done so.

On 25 January 2018, Woo won the Australia's Local Hero Award at the Australian of the Year Awards.

In March 2018, Woo was named a Top 10 Finalist in the Global Teacher Prize.

In May 2019, Woo received an Honorary Fellowship from Western Sydney University.

In September 2019, Woo became a Fellow of the Royal Society of New South Wales.

He received Mathical Honors for It's a Numberful World: How Math Is Hiding Everywhere

Personal life 
Woo is a committed Christian, stating, "We talk about the fact that the universe is designed in this way and you can find all of these patterns; do you think that that's a coincidence? One of the things I love to point out is we call the universe the cosmos which means ordered and structured and designed, as opposed to chaos, and the reason why we can find these mathematical principles is because there was a Designer. We didn't just spring into being. It has immense beauty."

Woo is married and has three children.

References

External links 

 
 
 

1985 births
Australian schoolteachers
Living people
University of Sydney alumni
Australian Christians
Australian YouTubers
Writers from Sydney
Australian television presenters
People educated at James Ruse Agricultural High School
21st-century educators
21st-century Australian male writers
Australian people of Chinese descent
Australian people of Malaysian descent